The 1925 Iowa State Teachers football team represented Iowa State Teachers College (later renamed University of Northern Iowa) as a member of the Iowa Conference during the 1925 college football season. In its first season under head coach Paul F. Bender, the team compiled an overall record of 5–1–2 with a mark of 4–1–1 in conference play.

Schedule

References

Iowa State Teachers
Northern Iowa Panthers football seasons
Iowa State Teachers football